Margaret of Bohemia (24 May 1335 – 1349, before October), also known as Margaret of Luxembourg, was a Queen consort of Hungary by her marriage to Louis I of Hungary. She was the second child of Charles IV, Holy Roman Emperor by his first wife Blanche of Valois. She was a member of the House of Luxembourg.

Life
Margaret was the second child of her father's first marriage. She was betrothed at the age of two to Amadeus VI, Count of Savoy, the contract being signed on 7 March 1338. The contract was, however, broken and Amadeus married Margaret's cousin, Bonne of Bourbon.

At the age of seven, Margaret was married in 1342 to Louis I of Hungary.

The marriage lasted seven years and no children were born of the union, probably because of Margaret's young age. She died in 1349 while still a minor, aged around fourteen, and was probably buried in Székesfehérvár Basilica. She had outlived her mother, Blanche, by only one year. Her husband remarried four years later to Elizabeth of Bosnia.

Notes

References 

 

|-

|-

1335 births
1349 deaths
14th-century Hungarian people
14th-century Hungarian women
Hungarian queens consort
Daughters of kings
Daughters of emperors
Children of Charles IV, Holy Roman Emperor